Le Temps qu'il fait is a French publishing house, first established in Cognac, and active since 1981.

History 
Created and directed by Georges Monti, Le Temps qu'il fait is now located at Bazas, in Gironde. The house draws its name from the eponymous novel by Armand Robin.

Nearly 500 works have been published (2008 figures), mainly in the field of French literature, but also photography. Also regularly published are the "Cahiers du Temps qui fait", critical volumes devoted to a writer, prestigious or kept secret, for example Philippe Jaccottet, Roger Munier, Jude Stéfan, Luc Dietrich, Louis-René des Forêts, Henri Thomas, François Augiéras, Yves Bonnefoy, André Frénaud, etc.

Some authors 

 Jean-Pierre Abraham
 Baptiste-Marrey
 Alice Becker-Ho
 Yves Bichet
 Christian Bobin
 François Boddaert
 Yves Bonnefoy
 Jacques Chauviré
 Pascal Commère
 Guy Debord
 Jean-Paul de Dadelsen
 Marc Deneyer
 Luc Dietrich
 André Dhôtel
 Thierry Girard
 Marie Huot
 Philippe Jaccottet
 Gérard Macé
 Jorge Manrique
 Denis Montebello
 Michel Orcel
 Gilles Ortlieb
 Ricardo Paseyro
 Georges Perros
 Jean-Claude Pirotte
 Didier Pobel
 Patrick Renou
 Catherine Rey
 André de Richaud
 Armand Robin
 Paul Louis Rossi
 Paul de Roux
 Valérie Rouzeau
 Lambert Schlechter
 Jude Stéfan
 Richard Texier
 Henri Thomas
 Jean-Loup Trassard

External links 
 Official website
 Espace officiel des éditions Le Temps qu'il fait sur Lekti-ecriture.com

Publishing companies of France
Publishing companies established in 1981
Gironde